The 2013–14 North Carolina A&T Aggies men's basketball team represented North Carolina Agricultural and Technical State University during the 2013–14 NCAA Division I men's basketball season. The Aggies, led by second year head coach Cy Alexander, played their home games at the Corbett Sports Center and were members of the Mid-Eastern Athletic Conference. They finished the season 9–23, 5–11 in MEAC play to finish in a five way tie for eighth place. They lost in the first round of the MEAC tournament to Howard.

Roster

Schedule

|-
!colspan=9 style="background:#002659; color:#FFBC00;"| Exhibition

|-
!colspan=9 style="background:#002659; color:#FFBC00;"| Regular season

|-
!colspan=9 style="background:#002659; color:#FFBC00;"| 2014 MEAC tournament

References

North Carolina A&T Aggies men's basketball seasons
North Carolina
2013 in sports in North Carolina
2014 in sports in North Carolina